Jasmine Guy is the debut and only studio album by American actress-singer Jasmine Guy, released in October 1990 on Warner Bros. Records. The album peaked at No. 143 on the Billboard 200 and 38 on Top R&B Albums chart. The singles, "Another Like My Lover", "Try Me" and "Just Want to Hold You", were top 40 hits on Billboard's Hot R&B Singles chart. Although the album was an overall success, plans for a follow-up release were terminated when Guy and Warner Bros. Records ended their three-year relationship in 1993.

Track listing

Personnel and Production
Tracks 1 and 4 written, arranged and produced by Full Force.  Track 1 recorded by Buzz Burrowes and Pete Diorio; mixed by Full Force and Pete Diorio.  Track 3 recorded by Paul Logus and Tony Maserati.  All instruments and programming by Full Force; backing vocals on track 1 by Ex-Girlfriend; backing vocals on track 3 by Cheryl Riley, Full Force and Jimmy Damski.
Track 2 arranged and produced by Timmy Gatling.  Recorded and mixed by Mitch Gibson.  All instruments by Scott Weatherspoon, with additional keyboards and backing vocals by Timmy Gatling.  Backing vocals and backing vocal arrangements by Jasmine Guy.
Tracks 3 and 6 arranged and produced by Oliver Leiber.  Track 3 engineered by Chopper Bock, Peter Martinsen, Tom Garneau and Tom Tucker, with assistance by John Chamberlin; mixed by Alan Meyerson.  Track 6 engineered by David Gamson, Jeff Lorber and Peter Martinsen; mixed by Alan Meyerson.  Oliver Leiber: Guitars, keyboards and drum programming on both tracks, with track 3 rap by Derrick "Delite" Steven.
Track 5 arranged and produced by Donald Robinson.  Engineered and mixed by Al Alberts and David Amlin, with recording assistance by Carl Angstadt. David Robinson: Keyboards; Saxophone: Branford Marsalis; Bass: Marcus Miller; Jim Salamone: Drums and drum programming.
Track 7 arranged and produced by DJ Eddie F., Nevelle and The Untouchables.  Engineered and mixed by Booker T. Jones III and Mark Paris.
Track 8 arranged and produced by Rex Salas; engineered by Dave Koenig and Rob Seifert.  Mixed by Dave Koenig.  Rex Salas, Chuckii Booker: Keyboards; Thomas Organ: Guitars; Darron Williams: Synthesized Bass; Derek Organ: Drum overdubs; Fred White, Jasmine Guy, Phillip Ingram and Valerie Pinkston: Backing Vocals
Track 9 arranged and produced by Mic Murphy.  Engineered by Stephen Seltzer, with assistance by Julian Briottet; vocals recorded by John K. Hegedes.  Mixed by Dennis Mitchell, with assistance by Leroy Quintyn.  Mic Murphy: Keyboards and drum programming
Track 10 arranged and produced by Raymond Jones.  Recorded and mixed by Booker T. Jones III, Khaliq Glover and Raymond Jones, with assistance by Jack Curtis Dubowski and Linda Morse.  Raymond Jones: Keyboards, drum programming, backing vocals; Randy Hall: Guitars, backing vocals; Cornelius Mims: Bass; Cree Summer, Jasmine Guy, Jeffrey Osborne, Kenny Harris, Kenny Jones and Kenny Jones.

Charts

Singles

References

External links
Jasmine Guy by Jasmine Guy. discogs.com

1990 debut albums
Jasmine Guy albums
Warner Records albums
Albums produced by Full Force